The Eastern Army of the Ottoman Empire (Turkish: Şark Ordusu) was one of the field armies of the Ottoman Army. It was formed during the mobilization phase of the First Balkan War. It confronted Bulgarian forces. On October 29, 1912, it was reorganized and renamed as the First Eastern Army (Birinci Şark Ordusu).

Eastern Army

Order of Battle, October 17, 1912 
On October 17, 1912, the army was structured as follows:

 Eastern Army HQ (Kavaklı, commander: Ferik Kölemen Abdullah Pasha, chief of staff: Miralay Djevat Bey)
I Corps
II Corps
III Corps (commanded by Mirliva Mahmud Muhtar Pasha)
IV Provisional Corps (commanded by Ferik Ahmed Abuk Pasha)
VII Provisional Corps
Adrianople Fortified Area Command (commanded by Ferik Mehmed Shukur Pasha)
Kırcaali Detachment

First Eastern Army 
On October 29, 1912, the army was structured as follows:

 First Eastern Army HQ: Ferik Ahmed Abuk Pasha
I Corps
II Corps
IV Provisional Corps
Independent Cavalry Division

Sources 

Field armies of the Ottoman Empire
Military units and formations of the Ottoman Empire in the Balkan Wars
1912 establishments in the Ottoman Empire